Qaamarngup uummataa (English title: Heart of light) is a 1998 Greenlandic and Danish produced drama film directed and written by Jacob Grønlykke. It is the first major production for a film to be completely shot in Greenland.

The film is about an Inuit alcoholic, who has to come to terms with his criminal son. He leaves his village and seeks recovery, and returns a new man, refreshed.
One of the central themes of the film is the conflict between modernity and tradition.

Cast
 Rasmus Lyberth ... Rasmus 
 Vivi Nielsen ... Marie 
 Nukâka Motzfeldt ... drum dancer 
 Niels Platow ... Mikael Berthelsen 
 Kenneth Rasmussen ... Simon 
 Knud Petersen   
 Laila Rasmussen ... Karina 
 Agga Olsen ... Magdalene 
 Jens Davidsen ... Vicar 
 Henrik Larsen ... Plummer
 Søren Hauch-Fausbøll ... Bar guest
 Asger Reher ... chief of police
 Karina Skands ... Girl in tent
 Julie Carlsen ... Girl in tent

References

External links

1998 films
Greenlandic drama films
Greenlandic-language films
Danish-language films
1998 drama films
Danish drama films
Films about alcoholism